Mabini, officially the Municipality of Mabini,  is a 1st class municipality in the province of Batangas, Philippines. According to the 2020 census, it has a population of 50,858 people.

Mabini is known for its diving and snorkeling sites. It is named after Apolinario Mabini, a Filipino revolutionary hero.

History

Founding Legend 
According to legend, the first Malay settlers to inhabit the vast fertile land bordering the two bodies of water now known as Batangas Bay and Balayan Bay first found anchor along the shores of the land protruding down southwestward, known as the Calumpan Peninsula.

The Malay settlers found the land fertile and agriculturally appropriate and the sea rich in marine resources, and they established their settlement in this once vast unknown land. As more Malay settlers arrived from distant lands, more settlements were founded until even the upland regions of the peninsula were settled. The inhabitants had their own form of village government. They were ruled by a headman, a datu, or a sultan, in case of big settlements. Malay civilization began to take roots. Rapid increase of population meant that it did not take long before several nearby regions were inhabited to comprise the whole province of Kumintang, better known later as Batangas.

Recorded History 
During the Spanish colonial rule, the Calumpan Peninsula was made a part of the pueblo of Bauan, in the province of Kumintang. The same peninsula territory of Bauan was subdivided into barrios: Mainaga, Pulong-Niogan, Pulong-Balibaguhan, Anilao, Solo, Pulong-Anahao, Bagalangit, Nag-Iba, Malimatoc, Saguing and Talaga. For more than three hundred years, while the archipelago was under Spanish control, the peninsula remained a part of the “pueblo” of Bauan until the early part of the American occupation. The people of this peninsula, like other people of other regions, suffered untold hardships under the Spanish rule. The  Philippine revolution of 1896 ended Spanish rule in the country, and in the Calumpan Peninsula the revolutionaries were led by Don Francisco Castillo, known as Apian Kiko.

Mabini, derived from the Philippine hero Apolinario Mabini, was founded when inhabitants of the region wanted a new municipality independent of the town of Bauan. Eleven barrios of the Calumpan Peninsula and the whole of the Maricaban Island was declared this new, independent municipality. The new municipality of Mabini was inaugurated on January 1, 1918, with Captain Francisco Castillo, known as the founder of the town, as the first appointed Municipal President.

Geography
According to the Philippine Statistics Authority, the municipality has a land area of  constituting  of the  total area of Batangas.

Barangays
Mabini is politically subdivided into 34 barangays. Barangay San Juan was formerly the sitios of Nag-ilong and Lugay in the barrio of Mainaga, constituted into a separate and independent barangay through Republic Act No. 212, approved June 1, 1948.

Climate

Demographics

In the 2020 census, Mabini had a population of 50,858.

Economy

Transportation

Jeepneys and tricycles are the main means of transportation around the town. Currently, there are two piers that serve the area: Anilao Pier and Talaga Pier, mainly catering for motor bancas going to and from the nearby island-town of Tingloy.

Healthcare
 Mabini Community Hospital
 Zigzag Hospital
 Mabini Health Center

Education

Colleges and universities
 Mabini College of Batangas
 Batangas State University - Mabini Campus

Secondary schools
 Anselmo A. Sandoval Memorial National High School
 Mabini College of Batangas (High school department)
 Saint Francis Academy
 Apolinario Mabini National High School
 Mabini National High School
 Santa Fe Integrated School

Primary and elementary schools

Private
 Jesus; Flock Academy-Anilao
 Lady Fatima Montessori School
 Santa Fe Integrated School
 Saint Lucresia's School

Public
 Bagalangit Elementary School
 Gasang Elementary School
 Laurel Elementary School
 Mabini Central Elementary School
 Malimatoc Elementary School
 Nag-iba ELementary School
 San Francisco-Mainaga Elementary School
 Talaga Elementary School
 San Teodoro Elementary School
 San Juan-Santo Niño Elementary School

Tourism

 Anilao – popular with budget divers and snorkelers. There are several diving centers where trips can be arranged to diving spots in Balayan Bay near Cape Bagalangit and near Sombrero and Maricaban Islands. Snorkeling is available off Maricaban's Cemetery Beach, Red Palm Beach, and around Sepok Point. Although the beach at Anilao is not recommended for swimming, thatched bamboo rafts can be rented with tables and benches at the Anilao Beach Resort and other resorts.
 Mount Gulugod-Baboy – the hills traversing Calumpang Peninsula. At its peak, one can see, from east to west: Janao Bay, Maricaban Strait which bears Sombrero and Maricaban Islands, a distant, faint blue Mindoro, Verde Island (SW) and Batangas Bay. The city and port of Batangas is visible on the west, following a farther Mount Daguldul. To the north is Mount Macolod, and even Mount Batulao and the Tagaytay highlands. It is popular among hikers during the Holy Week.

Gallery

References

External links

[ Philippine Standard Geographic Code]

Municipalities of Batangas
Underwater diving sites in the Philippines